The 50th Street station was a local station on the demolished IRT Second Avenue Line in Manhattan, New York City. It had three tracks and two side platforms. The next stop to the north was 57th Street. The next stop to the south was 42nd Street. The station closed on June 13, 1942.

References

External links

IRT Second Avenue Line stations
Railway stations closed in 1942
Former elevated and subway stations in Manhattan